Abu Dhabi Investment Authority Tower is a skyscraper in the city of Abu Dhabi, the capital of the United Arab Emirates. It  was completed in 2006 and hosts the Abu Dhabi Investment Authority.

See also
List of tallest buildings in Abu Dhabi
Al Hamra Tower in Kuwait, another skyscraper with a fold-like exterior

References

Skyscraper office buildings in Abu Dhabi
2006 establishments in the United Arab Emirates
Kohn Pedersen Fox buildings